Karen Simpson (born November 14, 1975) is a Canadian actress and fashion designer.

She was born in Montreal, Quebec. In 1998 she co-founded Ritual Designs, a Canadian corset and fashion company.

In 2003, she starred in Saved by the Belles. In 2004 she appeared in Pure.

She is regularly voted into the Best of Montreal (Montreal Mirror) top 10 lists for "Best Actress". Most recently (2006) she appeared at second place, behind Elisha Cuthbert.

Filmography
 Saved by the Belles as Scarlet
 Pure as Angie

Television
 Naked Josh, guest appearance (2005)

External links
 
 Saved by the Belles
 Pure
 Ritual Designs
 Best of Montreal
 Montreal Mirror

1975 births
Living people
Canadian film actresses
Actresses from Montreal
Anglophone Quebec people